The Royal Canadian Numismatic Association was founded in 1950. It is a nonprofit association for coin collectors and other people interested in Canadian numismatics. It has members throughout Canada and in other countries. At times, it also works with the Canadian Association for Numismatic Education (CAFNE), an arms length organization, which is defined by the CRA as a Canadian educational and charitable organization. CAFNE provides funding for some of the RCNA's educational seminars and publications.

Within the Royal Canadian Numismatic Association, founding member Jerome Remick suggested or initiated a number of significant changes. He recommended establishing a fellowship, encouraged the then CNA, now RCNA, to adopt a bilingual logo, and suggested creating the Young Numismatists Kit. In 1994, he established a literary award for best article in a club newsletter.

At the RCNA Annual Convention in Ottawa, ON from July 17–20, the membership ratified a name change to The Royal Canadian Numismatic Association,  and the royal grant of title awarded by Queen Elizabeth II in October 2007.

Presidents

Geoffrey G. Bell, F.C.N.A., F.C.N.R.S.
Charles D. Moore, 2003–2007
Michael Walsh, 2007–2009
Daniel Gosling F.R.C.N.A., 2009–2011
William Waychison F.R.C.N.A., F.C.N.R.S., F.O.N.A., 2011-2013
Bret Evans, 2013-2015

Conventions
The RCNA holds an annual convention in a different city each year. The convention includes educational seminars, both competitive and non-competitive educational display presentations, including a display by Canada's National Currency Museum ( a unit of the Bank of Canada), local tours, mint tours when available, specialty club meetings, luncheons, and an awards banquet. The convention also includes a major coin show, Canada's Money Collector Show, where within a bourse room, coin and money dealers buy and sell coins, and other numismatic items, with members and the public.

City and year of conventions

Toronto, Ontario, 1954
Ottawa, Ontario, 1955
London, Ontario, 1956
Hamilton, Ontario, 1957
Ottawa, Ontario, 1958
Regina, Saskatchewan, 1959
Sherbrooke, Quebec, 1960
Hamilton, Ontario, 1961
Detroit, Michigan, 1962
Vancouver, British Columbia, 1963
Halifax, Nova Scotia, 1964
Montreal, Quebec, 1965
Winnipeg, Manitoba, 1966
Ottawa, Ontario, 1967
Calgary, Alberta, 1968
Toronto, Ontario, 1969
Halifax, Nova Scotia, 1970
Vancouver, British Columbia, 1971
Toronto, Ontario, 1972
Saskatoon, Saskatchewan, 1973
Hamilton, Ontario, 1974
Calgary, Alberta, 1975
Ottawa, Ontario, 1976
Vancouver, British Columbia, 1977
London, Ontario, 1978
Edmonton, Alberta, 1979
Montreal, Quebec, 1980
Toronto, Ontario, 1981
Winnipeg, Manitoba, 1982
Moncton, New Brunswick, 1983
Hamilton, Ontario, 1984
Regina, Saskatchewan, 1985.
Toronto, Ontario, 1986.
Calgary, Alberta, 1987.
Charlottetown, Prince Edward Island, 1988.
Quebec City, Quebec, 1989.
Vancouver, British Columbia, 1990.
Toronto, Ontario, 1991.
Montreal, Quebec, 1992.
Moncton, New Brunswick, 1993.
Hamilton, Ontario, 1994.
Calgary, Alberta, 1995.
Montreal, Quebec, 1996.
Moncton, New Brunswick, 1997.
Edmonton, Alberta, 1998.
Kitchener, Ontario, 1999.
Ottawa, Ontario, 2000.
Quebec City, Quebec, 2001.
Vancouver, British Columbia, 2002.
Windsor, Ontario, 2003.
Toronto, Ontario, 2004.
Calgary, Alberta, 2005.
Niagara Falls, Ontario, 2006.
Niagara Falls, Ontario, 2007.
Ottawa, Ontario, 2008.
Edmonton, Alberta, 2009.
Saint John, New Brunswick, 2010.
Windsor, Ontario, 2011.
Calgary, Alberta, 2012.
Winnipeg, Manitoba, 2013.
Toronto, Ontario, 2014.
Halifax, Nova Scotia, 2015.
Ottawa, Ontario, 2016.

Publications
Members receive a subscription to the Canadian Numismatic Journal as part of their membership. Other RCNA publications include:
Canadian Coins 101, a home-study course, 
A Half Century of Advancement in Numismatics, a history of the CNA.
Royal Canadian Numismatic Correspondence Course - Part 1
Royal Canadian Numismatic Correspondence Course - Part 2

Library
Members can borrow books and other materials from the CNA's library by mail.

Seminars and correspondence courses

The Royal Canadian Numismatic Association launched its first numismatic correspondence course in 1995. Coordinating Editor of this project was Paul Johnson, while the Core Committee consisted of Brian Cornwell, Scott Douglas, Dr. Marvin Kay, Paul Petch and John Regitko and with special mention of the work by Barry McIntyre. The financial support for this project was attributed to Albert Kasman, and NESA, a then available Canadian educational and charitable organization.

Since the release of the original correspondence course in 1995, demand led to the creation of a new course for collectors. In 2005, the Royal Canadian Numismatic Association launched its new correspondence course, known as the Royal Canadian Numismatic Correspondence Course - Part II.  The course was also launched in grand style at the RCNA Convention in Calgary.

The Royal Canadian Numismatic Correspondence Course - Part II consists of seventeen chapters, 486 pages and hundreds of photos. The authors were chosen from the R.C.N.A. membership for their numismatic expertise of the subject covered. The chapters include the following:

Registrants who successfully complete either course I, or II, will receive a specially engraved "Certificate of Completion". Pricing for both courses is $90.00 each for R.C.N.A. members, and $132.00 for non-R.C.N.A. members [prices subject to change]. Payment is in Canadian dollars for Canadian residents and in US dollars for US residents. Others should contact the R.C.N.A.

The RCNA also offers educational seminars at its annual convention, and each fall of the year, a workshop on grading Canadian coins and coin and paper money preservation.

Fellows
In 1990, the Executive Committee of the C.N.A established a member service award: Fellow – Royal Canadian Numismatic Association. The criteria for this award is that a member of the Royal Canadian Numismatic Association must have performed a worthy service judged to be of a direct benefit to the association.
Nominations are made by members, and the recipients are decided by The Awards and Medals Committee. The committee proceeds by presenting its choices, up to 5 each year, at the annual convention. Fellows in the Royal Canadian Numismatic Association are authorized the use of the letters, F.R.C.N.A. to follow their name.
The first awards were made at the 1991 C.N.A. Convention in Toronto, Ontario.

Members awarded F.R.C.N.A. 1991 to date:

Awards
The RCNA Annual Convention bestows a number of awards. The list of awards is as follows:

 Best of Show Award - best exhibit, judged by a panel of volunteers assembled by Tim Henderson, Chairman R.C.N.A. Awards & Medals Committee.
 "Fellow of the R.C.N.A." Award - see above
 Guy Potter Literary Award - the original R.C.N.A. Literary Award was renamed in 1978 to honour the memory of Guy R.L. Potter, one of the founders of the Canadian Numismatic Association.
 J. Douglas Ferguson Award - presented to the living numismatist who has made the greatest contribution during the year to the advancement of numismatics in Canada by research, writing, publishing, or other means
 Jean Bullen Award - established in 2004 as an annual presentation for the best exhibit of Canadian coins displayed by a member at the R.C.N.A. Convention
 Jerome H. Remick III Literary Award - at the bequest of Jerome Remick, it is given annually to the author of the best numismatic article published in a local Canadian coin club newsletter during the previous calendar year

Jerome H Remick III Literary Award Winners

 Louise Graham Memorial Club of the Year Award - offered annually to R.C.N.A. member clubs entering a competition to acknowledge the club having made the most significant overall achievement on behalf of its members and of the hobby

Louise Graham Memorial Club of the Year Award Winners

 Paul Fiocca Award The Paul Fiocca Award is the highest distinction presented by The Royal Canadian Numismatic Association, and the second highest award in Canadian Numismatics. The award is named after the former publisher of Canadian Coin News, Paul Fiocca. It is presented annually for “Long term meritorious service or major contributions to the RCNA” and is an award not just to recognize the elite of the hobby, but any individual who may have worked behind the scenes, often for many decades, for the betterment of the Association.

This award is strictly an RCNA award for RCNA members, and is not to be confused with the J. Douglas Ferguson award, the highest award in Canadian numismatics, which does not require membership in the RCNA.

Paul Fiocca was publisher of Canadian Coin News from 1989 until his retirement, remaining a supporter of Canadian numismatics and giving freely of his own time and expertise. He served as editor of The CN Journal for a number of years, and was serving the RCNA in that capacity at the time of his death in 2007. The award that bears his name is funded by donations from Trajan Publishing Corporation and others that were his friends.

The President of the Association presents the Paul Fiocca Award at each year’s annual RCNA convention to a Royal Canadian Numismatic Association (RCNA) member.

The first recipient is James E. Charlton, one of Canada's most distinguished numismatists. The announcement was made July 19 during the annual awards banquet of The Royal Canadian Numismatic Association and the actual presentation was made several days later in Grimsby, Ontario. Mr. Charlton, the current honorary president of the RCNA, is often referred to as the dean of Canadian numismatics, or the father of modern numismatics in Canada. Charlton is best known for his Standard Catalogue of Canadian Coins. While the Certificate of Award could have listed Mr. Charlton’s significant contributions to the Association, it reads simply “For Long Term, Meritorious Service to the R.C.N.A.”  The criteria for the award is for long-term, meritorious service or major contributions to the RCNA.

Paul Fiocca Award Winners

 President’s Awards - The President has the right to recognize supporters, whether individuals or corporations, for outstanding support of the Association.

See also
Royal Canadian Numismatic Association medals and awards
Jerome Remick
Philately

References

Royal Canadian Numismatic Association Official site.

External links
Royal Canadian Numismatic Association Official site.

Organizations established in 1950
Non-profit organizations based in Toronto
1950 establishments in Ontario
Clubs and societies in Canada